The Panamanian dry forests ecoregion (WWF ID: NT0224) covers low-lying dry forests around the coast of the Gulf of Panama on the Pacific Ocean side of Panama.  It is one of the most heavily degraded ecoregions in Central America, having been heavily converted to agriculture.  However, it is also important for its high biodiversity, high rates of endemic species, and its importance as a biological corridor between the moist forests inland and the mangroves on the coast.

Location and description 
The Gulf of Panama has minor gulfs around its rim. The largest sector of this ecoregion is around the Gulf of Parita on the west. There are smaller sectors in the north on Panama Bay (around Panama City), and the Bay of San Miguel on the east. The western sector is surrounded on the interior side by the Isthmian-Pacific moist forests ecoregion, the eastern sectors by the Isthmian-Atlantic moist forests ecoregion. There is a thin strip of mangroves on the coast side of portions of the ecoregion.

Climate 
The climate of the ecoregino is Tropical savanna climate - dry winter (Köppen climate classification (Aw)).  This climate is characterized by relatively even temperatures throughout the year, and a pronounced dry season.  The driest month has less than 60 mm of precipitation, and is drier than the average month.  Because the ecoregion is in the rain shadow of the central mountains, precipitation is lower than in the surrounding moist forests, averaging 1,500 mm/year.

Flora and fauna 
Very little forest remains.  Over 70% of the ecoregion has been converted to agriculture.  15% is open forest, and 5% is broadleaf evergreen closed forest.  A little over 1% of the territory is herbaceous wetland, but grades into mangroves where salt-water influences dominate 1-3 km from the shore.  Species diversity is high due to the variety of ecozones meeting in close proximity.  518 species are vertebrate are known in the ecoregion.

Protected areas 
Less than 2% of the ecoregion is officially protected.  These protected areas include:
 Sarigua National Park
 Metropolitan Natural Park

References 

Neotropical tropical and subtropical moist broadleaf forests
Ecoregions of Panama